USS Marlin (SST-2), originally USS T-2 (SST-2), was a T-1-class training submarine in commission from 1953 to 1973. She was the second submarine of the United States Navy to be named for the marlin, a large game fish. Except for the first 25 early development pre-World War I submarines, she was one of the smallest operational submarines ever built for the U.S. Navy.

Construction and commissioning
T-2 was laid down on 1 May 1952 by the Electric Boat Division of General Dynamics Corporation in Groton, Connecticut. She was launched on 14 October 1953, sponsored by Mrs. William R. DeLoach, and commissioned as USS T-2 on 20 November 1953 with Lieutenant Edward Holt in command.

Service history
After shakedown in the Massachusetts Bay area, T-2,  got underway from New London, Connecticut, in late January 1954 for her home port at Naval Station Key West at Key West, Florida. Assigned to Submarine Squadron 12, Submarine Force, United States Atlantic Fleet, she immediately began operations in the sector from southern Florida to Guantánamo Bay, Cuba. For a decade and a half she performed valuable service as a target and training ship and helped to evaluate submarine and antisubmarine warfare equipment and tactics.

Renamed Marlin on 15 May 1956, the submarine deployed to Guantanamo Bay for services to the Fleet Training Group in January 1956, July and August 1958, March 1960, and December 1961. In March 1963, Marlin participated in the National Defense Industrial Association (NDIA) demonstration.

From 1963, Marlin performed mainly target duty for both surface and air antisubmarine units at the Fleet Sonar School at Key West.

In addition to target and training duty, Marlin participated in various fleet operations.

Decommissioning
Marlin and her sister ship Mackerel were decommissioned on 31 January 1973 in a dual ceremony at Naval Station Key West. Both also were stricken from the Naval Vessel Register that day.

Museum ship
On 15 August 1973, the U.S. Navy donated Marlin for use as a museum ship. On 20 August 1974, she was assigned for display as a memorial submarine in Freedom Park at the Greater Omaha Marina at 2000 North 25th Street, in Omaha, Nebraska.

Notes

References

Citations

External links 

 
 
 City of Omaha Parks Department Freedom Park Site

T-1-class submarines
Cold War submarines of the United States
Ships built in Groton, Connecticut
1953 ships
Museum ships in Nebraska
Museums in Omaha, Nebraska
Military and war museums in Nebraska
National Register of Historic Places in Omaha, Nebraska
Ships on the National Register of Historic Places in Nebraska